Darren Dietz (born July 17, 1993) is a Canadian-born Kazakhstani professional ice hockey defenceman currently playing under contract with HC CSKA Moscow of the Kontinental Hockey League (KHL). Dietz was selected by the Montreal Canadiens in the fifth round (138th overall) of the 2011 NHL Entry Draft.

Playing career
Dietz played in the WHL since the 2009–10 season with the Saskatoon Blades.  He was named to the 2013 WHL East First All-Star Team.

On September 16, 2013, after attending the Montreal Canadiens' pre-season training camp, Dietz was assigned to the Hamilton Bulldogs of the American Hockey League.

Montreal did not offer Dietz a contract, and he became a free agent. On July 1, 2016, Dietz agreed to a one-year, two-way contract with the Washington Capitals. In the 2016–17 season, Dietz was assigned to the Hershey Bears, collecting 6 goals and 12 points in 39 contests. On March 8, 2017, Dietz was loaned by the Capitals to fellow AHL outfit, the Texas Stars, in exchange for Mattias Bäckman. He contributed with 2 assists in 13 games with the Stars to end the season. On June 26, 2017,  the Capitals announced that Dietz would not be offered a new contract as a restricted free agent.

With no NHL prospects, Dietz signed a one-year deal with Kazakh club, Barys Astana of the KHL on July 1, 2017.

During the 2021–22 season, in the midst of his fifth season captaining Barys Nur-Sultan, Dietz ended his tenure in Kazakhstan after posting 21 points through 34 regular season games, when he was traded to CSKA Moscow in exchange for financial compensation on December 17, 2021.

Career statistics

Regular season and playoffs

International

Awards and honours

References

External links 

1993 births
Living people
Barys Nur-Sultan players
Canadian ice hockey defencemen
HC CSKA Moscow players
Hamilton Bulldogs (AHL) players
Hershey Bears players
Ice hockey people from Alberta
Montreal Canadiens draft picks
Montreal Canadiens players
Sportspeople from Medicine Hat
St. John's IceCaps players
Saskatoon Blades players
Texas Stars players
Kazakhstani ice hockey defencemen
Naturalised citizens of Kazakhstan